Most of the pre-modern coinage used in Sri Lanka or coins used in pre-Christian Sri Lanka can be categorised as punch-marked coins, tree and swastika coins, elephant and swastika coins and Lakshmi plaques.

Punch-marked coins

They are referred to as punch-marked coins or eldings. Similar coins have been unearthed throughout the island. Large numbers of such coins have been found in the North Central Province of Sri Lanka too but a study on regional varieties is yet to be done.

These punch marked coins are usually in silver and have assorted combinations of symbols punched on them, Usually the reverse of the coin is blank. Stylistically these coins are similar to coins used in the Indian sub-continent during this period. A recent publication on these coins attempts to identify symbols peculiar to Sri Lanka. Some of the more popular symbols are Sun, Moon, elephant, bull, nandipada, fish and peacock. The diversity of symbols suggests that these coins have been issued by regional rulers or traders and not by a central monarchy.

Tree and swastika coins 

The tree and swastika coins are always cast. The tree on these coins is sometimes called a bo-tree, a tree with religious significance to Buddhists. However, as these coins are pre-Buddhist, the tree is more likely to be a widely accepted holy tree from the region.

Elephant and swastika coins

The older coins of this type are cast and the later ones are struck. The cast coins are much thicker than the thinner struck coins. A struck coin is illustrated below.

Lakshmi plaques

Chera coins
The goddess Lakshmi coins are either cast or struck. The two coins illustrated below are cast. They are found in may sizes ranging from about 3 inches to half an inch. The obverse of these coins bear the image of the goddess holding lotus stalks, surmounted by two elephants pouring water. Initially these were thought to be votive offerings. but now scholars are unanimous that they were indeed coins. They are early coins of the Chera Dynasty from about 500 BCE found in Kandarodai.

The early period

Pandyan and Pallava coins
The bull, elephant and fish symbols figure prominently on the coins used in northern Sri Lanka by the Pandyan Dynasty during the early period. The lion features prominently on the Pallava coins.

The medieval period

Chola coins
Gold and copper coins issued by the Chola ruler Rajaraja Chola (985-1014) are excavated from many parts of Sri Lanka. The obverse and reverse of these coins are similar to the common Dambadeniya Massa coins issued by later Kalinga and Pandya rulers of Sri Lanka. This prototype for the Dambadeniya coins uses Tamil characters  on the reverse for the kings name.

Sethu bull coins

Several types of coins categorised as Sethu bull coins are found in large quantities in the northern part of Sri Lanka. Three types of this series are illustrated below. The obverse of these coins have a human figure flanked by lamps and the reverse has the Nandi (bull) symbol, the legend Sethu in Tamil with a crescent moon above. The obverse is similar to the contemporary Massa coins issued by the Kalinga and Pandyan rulers of the central Sri Lankan kingdom of Dambadeniya.

The late period

These coins known as 'Parakramabahu lion type' are found in large numbers in the northern and western parts of Sri Lanka. The king is Parakramabahu VI of Kotte and the coins are believed to have been issued by Sapumal Kumara (also known as Chempaka Perumal) who ruled Northern peninsula from nallur on behalf of the Kotte king, for some years. Although some writers have suggested that the lion represents Sinhala dominance over the Jaffna Kingdom, others have pointed out that the lion is stylistically Tamil, and unmistakably so.

As illustrated above the lion symbol was used on Jaffna coins by Pallava rulers  as well. The lion on the Rajadhiraja Chola II is very similar to the lion on the present Lion Flag of Sri Lanka.

The Dutch period
These heavy rough copper coins were struck by the Dutch East India Company to use in the Jaffna territory. They were issued in the denominations of 1 and 2 Stuivers. These coins are also referred to as 'Dutch dumps'. Coins similar to those minted in Jaffna were minted in Trincomalee, Colombo and Galle as well and they bear the letters T, C and G respectively as mint marks.

References

 H. W. Codrington, Ceylon Coins and Currency
 Abhayawardena Coins of Ceylon
 Punch marked coins of Sri Lanka
 Seyone Jaffna coins
 lakdiva.org

Sri Lanka
Sri Lanka
Coins, pre-modern